Miss Venezuela 1958 was the sixth edition of Miss Venezuela pageant held at Avila Hotel in Caracas, Venezuela, on July 14, 1958. The winner of the pageant was Ida Margarita Pieri (Miss Sucre).

The 1958 pageant had only four contestants because of political problems and the lack of sponsors for the event.

Final results
Miss Venezuela 1958 - Ida Margarita Pieri (Miss Sucre)
1st runner-up - Elena Russo (Miss Aragua)
2nd runner-up - Maritza Haack (Miss Caracas)
3rd runner-up - Aura González (Miss Distrito Federal)

Delegates

 Miss Aragua - Elena Russo Blanco
 Miss Caracas - Maritza Haack
 Miss Distrito Federal - Aura González
 Miss Sucre - Ida Margarita Pieri

External links
Miss Venezuela official website

1958 beauty pageants
1958 in Venezuela